Achilles/Engineer, released on February 15, 2005, through Hex Records, is a split album from Rochester-based hardcore band Achilles and Syracuse-based sludge metal band Engineer. For both bands it is the follow-up to their debut extended plays; Achilles by Achilles and Suffocation of the Artisan by Engineer. The album is split over two discs, where there bands have a disc each.

Achilles' participating songs were originally recorded with the intent for a split album with This Ship Will Sink, set for release during fall 2004. For unknown reasons, the release was cancelled and the songs were used for this split album instead.

Track listing

Personnel
Achilles
 Rory van Grol – vocals, production
 Rob Antonucci – guitar, album artwork, design, production
 Josh Dillon – bass guitar, production
 Chris Browne – drums, production

Studio personnel –  Achilles
 Dave Drago – engineering, mixing, mastering

Engineer
 Bob Gorham – vocals
 Ryan Gorham – guitar, backing vocals
 Brad Gorham – bass guitar, backing vocals
 Mike AuClair – drums

Studio personnel – Engineer
 Jason "Jocko" Randall – production, engineering, mixing, mastering

Additional personnel
 Shawn Carney – photography

Release history

Details
 Recording and mastering studio; Achilles: Hopewell Recording Studio, Canandaigua, New York
 Recording and mastering studio; Engineer: More Sound Studio, Syracuse, New York
 Distributor: Lumberjack Mordam Music Group
 Recording type: studio
 Recording mode: stereo
 SPARS code: n/a

References

External links
 Achilles MySpace
 Achilles Facebook
 Achilles PureVolume
 Achilles Last.fm
 Engineer MySpace
 Engineer PureVolume
 Engineer Last.fm
 Hopewell Recording Studio Website
 More Sound Studio Website
 Hex Records MySpace

2005 albums
Split albums
Engineer (band) albums
Achilles (band) albums